The Nandi Award for Best Screenplay Writer was commissioned by the Nandi Awards committee in 1977.
 The winner is awarded a "Copper Nandi", a cash award of ₹10,000 and a commendation certificate.

Most number of Awards were received by Srinu Vaitla who won the award three times, followed by A. Karunakaran, Singeetam Srinivasa Rao, and Neelakanta with two.

Winners

See also
 Cinema of Andhra Pradesh
 Nandi Awards

References

Screenplay Writer